Di'Anno is the 1984 self-titled album of the band of the same name. The lead singer Paul Di'Anno had been the frontman of the British heavy metal band Iron Maiden for three years, before being dismissed for his erratic behaviour. The band bearing his name and playing very commercial heavy rock was his first and short-lived solo project.

This album was actually released in Japan first with strange album title Two Swimmers & a Bag of Jockies. This was actually intended as a tribute to their friend and ex-drummer Mark Stewart, a cockney from East London. Two swimmers refers to fish, and jockies' whips is slang for chips - so literally: 2 fish and a bag of chips.

The album reached only No. 105 on the UK Albums Chart and the band disbanded at the conclusion of the short tour supporting the release.

Track listing
All tracks by DiAnno, Browne, Slater, Venables and Ward, except "Heartuser" by Terry Britten & Sue Shifrin.

"Flaming Heart" - 3:49
"Heartuser" - 4:03
"Here to Stay" - 4:51
"The Runner" - 3:16
"Tales of the Unexpected" - 6:06
"Razor Age" - 5:18
"Bright Lights" - 3:40
"Lady Heartbreak" - 4:18
"Antigua" - 4:35
"Road Rat" - 3:54

Personnel 
Paul Di'Anno - lead vocals
Lee Slater- guitar, backing vocals
P.J. Ward - guitar, backing vocals
Mark Venables - keyboards, backing vocals
Kevin Browne - bass, backing vocals
Dave Irving - drums

References

Paul Di'Anno albums
1984 debut albums
New Wave of British Heavy Metal albums
Albums recorded at Rockfield Studios